Junaid Siddique (born 6 December 1992) is a Pakistani-born  cricketer who plays for the United Arab Emirates national cricket team. Siddique was born in Multan, Pakistan. He moved to the UAE in 2014.

In October 2019, he was added to the United Arab Emirates' squad for the 2019 ICC T20 World Cup Qualifier tournament in the UAE. He made his Twenty20 International (T20I) debut for the United Arab Emirates, against Oman, on 18 October 2019. In December 2019, he was named in the One Day International (ODI) squad for the 2019 United Arab Emirates Tri-Nation Series. He made his ODI debut for the UAE, against the United States on 8 December 2019. In December 2020, he was one of ten cricketers to be awarded with a year-long full-time contract by the Emirates Cricket Board.

References

External links
 

1992 births
Living people
Emirati cricketers
United Arab Emirates One Day International cricketers
United Arab Emirates Twenty20 International cricketers
Pakistani emigrants to the United Arab Emirates
Pakistani expatriate sportspeople in the United Arab Emirates
People from Multan
Pakistani cricketers